Saint-Cernin-de-Labarde is a commune in the Dordogne department in Nouvelle-Aquitaine in southwestern France.

Population

See also
Communes of the Dordogne department
Château de l'Herm

References

Communes of Dordogne